is a passenger railway station located in the city of Toda, Saitama, Japan, operated by the East Japan Railway Company (JR East).

Lines
Some trains continue northward to  via the Kawagoe Line and southward to  via the TWR Rinkai Line. The station is located 12.3 km north of Ikebukuro Station. The station identification colour is "vermillion".

Station layout

The station consists of one elevated island platform serving two tracks, with the station building located underneath. The tracks of the Tōhoku Shinkansen also run adjacent to this station, on the west side. The station is staffed.

Platforms

An arrangement of the Toda City song has been used as the departure melody for trains departing from the up platform (platform 1) since 1 August 2007.

History
Toda Station opened on 30 September 1985.

Passenger statistics
In fiscal 2019, the station was used by an average of 21,355 passengers daily (boarding passengers only).

The passenger figures for previous years are as shown below.

Surrounding area

East side
 Toda City Office
 Toda Civic Cultural Hall
 Ushiroya Park
 Warabi Police Station
 Warabi Post Office
 Kami-Toda Post Office

West side
 Toda Municipal Library
 Toda Civic Folk Museum
 Toda Civic Sports Centre
 Toda Fire Station
 Saitama Prefectural Toda Shoyo High School
 Toda Municipal Niizo Junior High School
 Toda Municipal Niizo Kita Elementary School

See also
List of railway stations in Japan

References

External links

 Toda Station information (JR East) 

Railway stations in Japan opened in 1985
Saikyō Line
Stations of East Japan Railway Company
Railway stations in Saitama Prefecture
Toda, Saitama